Kreidler is a surname of several possible origins. It may be a German and Yiddish occupational surname derived from an occupation related to chalk, from Gegman Kreide, "chalk".  It may be a toponymic surname for someone from Kreidel. Notable people with the surname include:

Johannes Kreidler, German  composer, performer, conceptual and media artist
Mike Kreidler,  American physician and politician
Rosie Bonds Kreidler, former American athlete
Ryan Kreidler, American baseball player

See also

References